Tholu Bommalata ( Puppetry) is a 2019 Telugu comedy drama film, produced by Maganti Durga Prasad on Suma Durga Creations banner and directed by Viswanath Maganti. It stars Rajendra Prasad, Vennela Kishore, Viswant Duddumpudi, Harshitha Chowdary in the lead roles and music composed by Suresh Bobbili.

Plot
The film begins on Somaraju / Sodala Raju (Rajendra Prasad) a top-tier, holding high-esteem in a village. He leads a delightful life with the entire villagers and his son Murali (Devi Prasad) & daughter Janaki (Kalpana) seldom visit him. Once, his grandson Rushi (Viswant duddumpudi) & granddaughter Varsha (Harshita) arrive claiming that they are in love and seeks his help for their espousal as the respective families despise each other. Here, Somaraju promises them to couple up which he determines as his last wish and even convinces his children. But suddenly, Somaraju passes away when turbulence occurs in between the elders for the property. Parallelly, the ego clashes split Rishi & Varsha too. Right now, Somaraju’s soul moving around them until the completion of the 12th-day ceremony goes into despondency learning the real appearance of his family. During that plight, Somaraju teams up with his distant relative Santosh (Vennela Kishore) who has the power of talking with sprits. With his support, he makes a play and disappears the discord in the family and also the rift between Rishi & Varsha. Finally, the movie ends Somaraju’s soul is happily freed on the 12th-day affirming the values of human relations.

Cast
Rajendra Prasad as Somaraju / Sodala Raju 
Vennela Kishore as Santosh
Viswant Duddumpudi as Rushi 
Harshitha Chowdary as Varsha
Chalapati Rao as Ranga 
Prasad Babu as Somaraju's friend
Narayana Rao as Chandram
Thagubothu Ramesh as Aatmaram
Dhanraj as Kotthem
Devi Prasad as Murali, Somaraju's son
Narra Srinivas as Somaraju's son-in-law
Pooja Ramachandran as Bhavana
Sangeetha as Somaraju's sister
Kalpana as Janaki, Somaraju's daughter 
Sireesha Sougandh as Somaraju's daughter-in-law

Soundtrack 

Music composed by Suresh Bobbili. Lyrics were written by Chaitanya Prasad.  Music released on ADITYA Music Company.

References 

2010s Telugu-language films
Indian family films
Indian comedy-drama films